KBLO (102.3 FM) is a radio station broadcasting a Christian Spanish format. Licensed to Corcoran, California, United States, the station serves the Visalia-Tulare-Hanford area. The station is currently owned by Centro Cristiano Amistad Church.

History
The station was granted on June 24, 1987, as a class "A", and the call sign KLCZ was assigned on June 30, 1987. Multiple construction permit extensions and an upgrade to class "B1" were applied for over the next ten years. The station finally came on November 17, 1999, with the KLCZ call sign. On November 19, 2001, the call sign was changed to KXQX. The KBLO call sign was assigned on June 1, 2005, as Radio Lobo. It was a simulcast of KLOQ-FM 98.7 of Winton, CA, which is owned by Mapleton, who had purchased 102.3 in April 2005 from Rak Communications, Inc. The studios of both stations were in Merced. The station carried a Regional Mexican format. KBLO was sold in October 2010 to CCA License Holdings LLC and the format was changed to a Christian Spanish-language format.

On January 24, 2023, KBLO's license was transferred to Centro Cristiano Amistad Church, the 100% owner of CCA License Holdings.

The station's transmitter and tower are located off RD 76 and West Paige Ave, about three miles west of the city of Tulare, California.

References

External links

Corcoran, California
BLO
BLO
Radio stations established in 1999
1999 establishments in California